Daniel Quaye (born 25 December 1980) is a Ghanaian former professional footballer who played as a defender.

Club career 
Quaye is one of Ghana's favourite footballing talents after his long and distinguished career with Hearts of Oak.

Since joining the Ghanaian giants in 1999, he has been instrumental in the club's six league title successes along with helping them lift the CAF Champions League in 2000 and CAF Confederation Cup in 2005.

After nine years Quaye signed with Chinese club Chongqing Lifan, playing 15 matches in one year before returning to former club Hearts of Oak in August 2007. He was released by Hearts of Oak and re-joined Chongqing Lifan in March 2008. In January 2009, he again left than Chongqing Lifan and signed than on 9 April 2009 to Eleven Wise in his homeland Ghana. In summer 2009 he moved back to China who signing for Yanbian FC. Quaye extended his contract with Yanbian at the beginning of season 2010.

Quaye moved to China League One side Beijing Baxy in February 2012.

International career 
However the accomplished defender only featured in three of the Black Stars' qualifying games and his call-up to the Finals squad ended a two-year absence from the international scene.

He was a member of the national team and was called up to the 2006 World Cup and was member of the Ghana national under-17 football team at 1997 FIFA U-17 World Championship.

Honours 

 Ghana Premier League: 1999, 2000, 2001, 2002, 2004, 2005
 Ghanaian FA Cup: 1999, 2000
 CAF Champions League: 2000
 African Super Cup: 2001
 CAF Confederation Cup: 2005

References

External links

1980 births
Living people
Ghanaian footballers
Ghana international footballers
2006 FIFA World Cup players
Accra Great Olympics F.C. players
Sekondi Wise Fighters players
Accra Hearts of Oak S.C. players
Expatriate footballers in China
Chongqing Liangjiang Athletic F.C. players
Yanbian Funde F.C. players
Beijing Sport University F.C. players
China League One players
Ghanaian expatriate sportspeople in China
Ghana under-20 international footballers
Association football defenders